Donga Pelli is a 1988 Indian Telugu film directed by Ravi Raja Pinisetty starring Sobhan Babu, Vijaya Shanti, Sumalatha and Gollapudi Maruti Rao in the  lead roles. The film produced by Anam Gopalakrishna Reddy had musical score by Chakravarthy. The film was a remake of Tamil film Ninaive Oru Sangeetham.

Cast
 Sobhan Babu 
 Vijaya Shanti 
 Sumalatha 
 Gollapudi Maruti Rao 
 Sutti Velu
 Annapurna 
 Y. Vijaya

Soundtrack
Music was composed by Chakravarthy.

References

External links
 

1988 films
1980s Telugu-language films
Films directed by Ravi Raja Pinisetty
Films scored by K. Chakravarthy
Telugu remakes of Tamil films